National Highway 334B, commonly called NH 334B is a national highway in  India. It is a spur road of National Highway 34. NH-334B traverses the states of Uttar Pradesh and Haryana in India.

Route 
Meerut, Baghpat, Sonipat, Kharkhauda,Hassangarh Sampla, Jhajjar, Charkhi Dadri,(Badhra) Loharu

Junctions  
 
  Terminal near Meerut.
  near Baghpat
  near Sonipat
  near Sonipat
  near Kharkhauda
  near Hassangarh
  near Jhajjar
  near Charkhi Dadri
  near Charkhi Dadri
  Terminal near Loharu.

See also 
 List of National Highways in India
 List of National Highways in India by state

References

External links 

 NH 334B on OpenStreetMap

National highways in India
National Highways in Uttar Pradesh
National Highways in Haryana